Charles Elmer Clapp III (born January 1, 1959) is an American rower who competed as a collegiate rower at the University of Washington (class of 1981), in the men's eight at the 1981 World Rowing Championships (winning a bronze medal), and at the 1984 Summer Olympics. He won the silver medal in the Men's eights event.

He was born in Providence, Rhode Island and is the brother to six other siblings including rower Gene Clapp.

References

1959 births
Living people
Rowers at the 1984 Summer Olympics
Olympic silver medalists for the United States in rowing
American male rowers
Medalists at the 1984 Summer Olympics
World Rowing Championships medalists for the United States